WJKI may refer to:

 WJKI (AM), a radio station (1320 AM) licensed to serve Salisbury, Maryland, United States
 WJKI-FM, a radio station (103.5 FM) licensed to serve Bethany Beach, Delaware, United States